Anton Sveinn McKee (born 18 December 1993 in Reykjavík) is an Icelandic swimmer who competes in the Men's 400m individual medley.

Career

International Swimming League 
in spring of 2020, Anton signed for the Toronto Titans, the first Canadian based team in the ISL.

World Championships 
At the 2012 Summer Olympics he finished 31st overall in the heats in the Men's 400 metre individual medley and failed to reach the final.

Other 
At the 2015 Games of the Small States of Europe in Iceland, Anton won three silver medals, for 200 m breaststroke, 200 m medley and as part of the 4 x 200 m freestyle team.
At the 2013 Games of the Small States of Europe in Luxemburg, Anton won six gold medals for 400 m freestyle, 1500 m freestyle, 100 m breaststroke, 200 m breaststroke, 200 m medley and the 400 m medley. He also won three silver medals in 200 m freestyle and as part if the 4 x 200 m and 4 x 100 m freestyle teams. He also took home a bronze medal from these games as part of the 4 x 100 m freestyle team.

References

External links
IOC Profile 

Anton Sveinn McKee
Anton Sveinn McKee
1993 births
Living people
Anton Sveinn McKee
Swimmers at the 2012 Summer Olympics
Swimmers at the 2016 Summer Olympics
Swimmers at the 2020 Summer Olympics
Icelandic male medley swimmers
Swimmers at the 2010 Summer Youth Olympics